Wilfred Breistrand (April 29, 1921 – August 3, 2007) was a Norwegian actor and film director.

Biography
Breistrand made his debut in 1941 at the Trøndelag Theater as Amund in Til Sæters by Claus Pavels Riis. He performed there until 1944, at the New Theater from 1944 to 1948, at the National Theatre in Oslo from 1948 to 1970, with NRK's Television Theater from 1970 to 1973, and with the Norwegian theater after 1973. Among other roles, he played Elias in Bjørnstjerne Bjørnson's Over ævne I, Gustav in Helge Krog's Konkylien, Lebcau in Arthur Miller's Incident at Vichy (Norwegian title: Det hendte i Vichy), various roles in Shakespeare plays (Bottom in A Midsummer Night's Dream, Banquo in Macbeth, and Horatio in Hamlet), and the title role in Ambassador (Norwegian title: Ambassadøren) by Sławomir Mrożek. He appeared in a large number of Norwegian films, debuting in Ni liv in 1957. He also played leading roles in the television drama De hvite bussene (1989), Anton (1973), and Åpenbaringen (1977). Breistrand received the Amanda Award for best actor in 1992 for the role of Thomas F in the television drama Th. F's siste nedtegnelser til almenheten, based on the novels of Kjell Askildsen.

Breistrand was the father of the film director and writer Ulf Breistrand.

Filmography

As actor

 1956: Kvinnens plass as an editorial staff member
 1957: Ni liv as a sled puller
 1960: Den fjerde nattevakt (TV) as David Finne
 1960: Venner as the senior resident attending physician
 1961: Den store barnedåpen (TV) as Storm, a curate
 1961: Hans Nielsen Hauge as a lieutenant in Fredrikstad
 1961: Sønner av Norge as the client at the tax appraisal office
 1962: Sønner av Norge kjøper bil as a car mechanic
 1964: Alle tiders kupp as Berg, a police officer
 1964: Husmorfilmen høsten 1964
 1965: De kalte ham Skarven as Lecturer Marbo
 1966: Før frostnettene as Jens Gunnerus
 1966: Kontorsjef Tangen (TV series)
 1966: Sult
 1968: Smuglere
 1968: Unge helter as Captain Kantzeler
 1970: Balladen om mestertyven Ole Høiland as Enger the watchmaker
 1972: Motforestilling
 1973: Anton as Anton’s father
 1973: Kirsebærhaven (TV) as Simjeonov Pistsjik
 1974: Olsenbanden møter Kongen & Knekten as the crime boss
 1975: Faneflukt as a German officer
 1975: Skraphandlerne as Arthur Hagen
 1976: Bør Børson II as Olsen Jammerdal
 1976: Den sommeren jeg fylte 15 as the father
 1976: Vårnatt as the father
 1977: Åpenbaringen as Walter
 1977: Olsenbanden & Dynamitt-Harry på sporet as the crime boss
 1982: Fleksnes fataliteter (TV series, episode: "Villmarkens sønn") as the doctor
 1983: Hockeyfeber as Mr. Big
 1983: Piratene as Dr. Bakke
 1988: De hvite bussene (TV) as Niels Christian Ditleff
 1989: Fedrelandet (TV drama) as Old Eggen
 1989: Thomas F's siste nedtegnelser til almenheten as Thomas F
 1996: Markus og Diana as the father
 1996: Spor as man no. 1
 1996: Syndig sommer
 2000: Før stormen as Sander’s father
 2001: Nini (TV series, episode: "Den kalkulerte risiko") as Hanzen

As director

 1965: De kalte ham Skarven

References

External links
 
 Wilfred Breistrand at the National Theatre
 Wilfred Breistrand at Sceneweb
 Wilfred Breistrand at Filmfront
 Wilfred Breistrand at the Swedish Film Database

1921 births
2007 deaths
20th-century Norwegian male actors
Actors from Trondheim